The Suillaceae are a family of fungi in the order Boletales (suborder Suillineae), containing the boletus-like Suillus, the small truffle-like Truncocolumella, as well as the monotypic genus Psiloboletinus. As of 2008, there are 54 species in the family. Gastrosuillus, once considered a distinct genus, has been shown with molecular analysis to be a recent evolutionary derivative of Suillus. Fuscoboletinus, described by Pomerleau and Smith in 1962, has also been subsumed into Suillus.

References

Cited literature

Boletales
Basidiomycota families